Terry Rooney may refer to:

 Terry Rooney (politician) (born 1950), British politician 
 Terry Rooney (baseball coach) (born 1973),  American baseball coach